Swartland Shale Renosterveld (West Coast Renosterveld) is a critically endangered vegetation type of the Western Cape, South Africa.

Distribution

This unique type of Renosterveld vegetation occurs over the Swartland and Boland areas, on the West Coast lowlands to the north of Cape Town. It extends from north of Piketberg, southwards as far as Somerset West. Around 10 percent of this area lies within the Cape Town metropol (where historically it was the most widespread form of Renosterveld, especially concentrated on the Tygerberg Hills in the northern suburbs) and, overall, over 90 percent of this vegetation has been destroyed for farming and other development. The remaining patches are threatened by invasive alien plants and further development, making this vegetation type critically endangered.

Description
Undisturbed, it forms tall, open shrubland over undulating valleys and plains. It usually grows in clay soils that are derived from the Malmesbury Group Shales. Termite mounds create large, round hummocks called “heuweltjies”, that are a prominent feature of this vegetation type, appearing as pale spots on the landscape. Indigenous trees and older thicket often occur around these features. The Renosterbos is relatively common in this vegetation, but this may be due to recent overgrazing – the renosterbos is rather inedible and consequently livestock tend to avoid it.

Threats and conservation

The vast majority of Swartland Shale Renosterveld has been lost (the target of saving 26% is now unattainable, as 90% is already completely transformed for farming). Remnants survive in tiny isolated patches within farmland, usually only on rougher, steeper ground that cannot be cultivated. Only a few pockets are actually protected, and most surviving areas are threatened by invasive alien plants such as Acacia saligna (“Port Jackson”), Acacia mearnsii and a variety of other invasive trees, grasses and herbs.

List of some endemic plants
There are a great many plant species within this ecosystem which are totally endemic - existing in this vegetation type and nowhere else in the world. A partial list is included below.

 Leucadendron verticillatum
 Aspalathus acanthophylla
 Aspalathus horizontalis
 Aspalathus pinguis subsp. longissima
 Aspalathus pinguis subsp. occidentalis
 Aspalathus puberula
 Aspalathus rectistyla
 Cliffortia acockii
 Lotononis complanata
 Serruria incrassata
 Erepsia ramosa
 Ruschia patens
 Ruschia pauciflora
 Indigofera triquetra
 Aristea lugens
 Babiana angustifolia
 Babiana latifolia
 Babiana odorata
 Babiana secunda
 Hesperantha pallescens
 Hesperantha spicata subsp. fistulosa
 Lachenalia liliflora
 Lachenalia mediana rogersii
 Lachenalia orthopetala
 Lapeirousia fastigiata
 Moraea gigandra
 Moraea tulbaghensis
 Oxalis fragilis
 Oxalis involuta
 Oxalis leptocalyx
 Oxalis levis
 Oxalis macra
 Oxalis perineson
 Oxalis strigosa
 Pelargonium viciifolium

Gallery

See also
 Biodiversity of Cape Town
 List of nature reserves in Cape Town
 Peninsula Shale Renosterveld
 Renosterveld

References

Flora of South Africa
Vegetation types of Cape Town